Kristian Bernt Torgersen (born 16 May 2003) is a Norwegian football midfielder who plays for Stabæk.

Hailing from Haslum in Bærum, he also played youth football for Fornebu FK before joining the youth ranks of Stabæk. He was also a Norwegian youth international from age 15. He signed a professional contract in August 2020, and made his senior debut in December 2020 against Strømsgodset. In the 2021 season opener against Odd, three days after his 18th birthday, he was in the starting eleven.

His hobbies include skateboarding and music producing.

References

2003 births
Living people
Sportspeople from Bærum
Norwegian footballers
Stabæk Fotball players
Eliteserien players
Association football midfielders
Norway youth international footballers